{{infobox officeholder
| honorific_prefix = Colonel
| name         = Sir Thomas Fermor-Hesketh
| honorific_suffix = Bt
| image        = Anthony Frederick Augustus Sandys - Sir Thomas George Fermor-Hesketh, 7th Baronet Hesketh of Rufford (1849-1924).jpg
| caption      = Sir Thomas Fermor-Hesketh by Frederick Sandys, 1883| office       = High Sheriff of Northamptonshire
| term_start   = 1881
| term_end     = 1881
| predecessor  = Henry Vane Forester Holdich Hungerford
| successor    = Richard Henry Ainsworth
| birth_name   = Thomas George Hesketh
| birth_date   = 
| birth_place  =
| death_date   = 
| education    = 
| parents      = Sir Thomas Fermor-Hesketh, 5th BaronetLady Anna Maria Isabella Fermor
| spouse       = 
| children     =
| relations    =
}}
Sir Thomas George Fermor-Hesketh, 7th Baronet (9 May 1849 – 19 April 1924) was a British baronet and soldier.

Early life
Born Thomas George Hesketh, he was the second son of Sir Thomas Fermor-Hesketh, 5th Baronet, and Lady Anna Maria Isabella Fermor, daughter of Thomas Fermor, 4th Earl of Pomfret.

In 1867 he and his father assumed by Royal licence the additional surname of Fermor and in 1876 he succeeded his elder brother as 7th Baronet of Rufford.

Career
Fermor-Hesketh was commissioned as a Lieutenant in the Rifle Brigade.  In January 1879 he started a world cruise in his newly constructed steam auxiliary yacht Lancashire Witch. After he left Madeira en route to Montevideo news arrived there of the British defeat at the Battle of Isandlwana in the Anglo-Zulu War.  The news eventually caught up with him at Sandy Point (Punta Arenas) in late March and he immediately set sail for Natal via the Falklands. He offered his services to the army and became ADC to Redvers Buller, becoming involved in mounted action at the Battle of Ulundi. He was appointed Honorary Colonel of the 4th (2nd Royal Lancashire Militia) Battalion, King's (Liverpool Regiment) in 1881, and continued in that role until his death.

After the war Sir Thomas continued his world cruise and in 1880 was instrumental in the attempted rescue at sea off the coast of Mexico of a number of citizens of San Francisco. In recognition of this, he was honoured by the city, and at a party in his honour. In 1881 he was appointed high Sheriff of Northamptonshire.

Personal life

While in San Francisco, Sir Thomas came to the attention of the San Francisco heiress Florence Emily Sharon (1858–1924). Florence was the daughter of U.S. Senator William Sharon, who had made an enormous fortune in the gold, silver, banking and hotel business in California and Nevada. The first United States Senator from Nevada, Sharon was also the wealthiest man in the state. By the early 1880s, his empire was such that he was the largest single tax payer in California. The two were married on 22 December 1880 at the Ralston Hall Mansion of Belmont, California, Together, they had two sons:

 Thomas Fermor-Hesketh, 1st Baron Hesketh (1881–1944), who also married an American heiress, Florence Louise Breckinridge, a daughter of John Witherspoon Breckinridge (son of Vice President John C. Breckinridge) and the former Louise (née Tevis) (a daughter of banker Lloyd Tevis). After her parents divorced, her mother married Frederick W. Sharon, the brother of Sir Thomas' wife.
 Frederick Fermor-Hesketh (1883–1910), who went missing in 1910.

When his father-in-law died in 1885, he left the bulk of his estate to his daughter Florence. When her brother Frederick died, the whole of the Senator's fortune passed to she and the Fermor-Hesketh family. They lived in Rufford Hall, Ormskirk, Lancashire.

Fermor-Hesketh died on 19 April 1924 aged 74, and was succeeded in the baronetcy by his son Thomas, who in 1935 was elevated to the peerage as Baron Hesketh. Lady Fermor-Hesketh died after falling down the stairs while visiting Euston Hall in September 1924.

Legacy
Hesketh Island, Kachemak Bay, Cook Inlet, Alaska was named after Sir Thomas following his visit to the area in his yacht Lancashire Witch'' in 1880.

References

External links
Sir Thomas George Fermor-Hesketh, 7th Baronet Hesketh of Rufford (1849-1924), on his horse 'Captain Jack' by A. Jules Imschoot.

1849 births
1924 deaths
High Sheriffs of Northamptonshire
Baronets in the Baronetage of Great Britain
Rifle Brigade officers